Fluker may refer to:
 Fluker, Louisiana, an unincorporated community in Tangipahoa Parish, Louisiana, United States

People with the surname
 D. J. Fluker (born 1991), American football player
 Mick Fluker (1926–1990), Canadian politician
 Tye'sha Fluker (born 1984), American basketball player

See also
 Fluke (disambiguation)